The Scottish Senior Curling Championships is an annual curling tournament held to determine the best senior-level men's and women's curling teams in Scotland. Senior level curlers must be over the age of 50 as of June 30 in the year prior to the tournament. It has been held annually since the 1972–1973 season for senior men and the 1980–1981 season for senior women. The championship teams play at the World Senior Curling Championships later in the season.

Past champions 
Skips marked bold

Men

Women

References

See also
Scottish Men's Curling Championship
Scottish Women's Curling Championship
Scottish Mixed Curling Championship
Scottish Mixed Doubles Curling Championship
Scottish Junior Curling Championships
Scottish Schools Curling Championship
Scottish Wheelchair Curling Championship

Curling competitions in Scotland
Recurring sporting events established in 1973
Recurring sporting events established in 1981
National curling championships